In Person at the Americana is an LP album by Julie London, released by Liberty Records under catalog number LRP-3375 as a monophonic recording and catalog number LST-7375 in stereo in 1964. It was arranged and conducted by Don Bagley.

Track listing

  Opening / "Lonesome Road" (Nathaniel Shilkret, Gene Austin)–2:32
 "Send for Me" (Ollie Jones)–2:15
 "My Baby Just Cares for Me" (Walter Donaldson, Gus Kahn)–3:34
 "The Trolley Song" (Hugh Martin, Ralph Blane)–2:07
 "Daddy" (Bobby Troup)–2:56
 "Medley:  Basin Street Blues/St. Louis Blues/Baby Baby All the Time" (Spencer Williams/W. C. Handy/Bobby Troup)–4:49
 "Kansas City" (Jerry Leiber, Mike Stoller)–2:20
 "Bye Bye Blackbird" (Ray Henderson, Mort Dixon)–2:27
 "By Myself" (Arthur Schwartz, Howard Dietz)–4:12
 "I Love Paris" (Cole Porter)–2:14
 "Gotta Move" (Peter Matz)–1:39
 "Cry Me a River" (Arthur Hamilton)–2:41 
 "The Man That Got Away" (Harold Arlen, Ira Gershwin) / Closing–3:12

Selected personnel
 Julie London - vocals
 Jerome Richardson - reeds
 Sal Salvador - guitar
 Don Bagley - double bass, arranger
 Ken Albers - vocal arranger
 Tom Dowd - engineer
 David Hassinger - engineer

References

Owen, Michael (2017). Go Slow: The Life of Julie London. Chicago Review Press.

1964 live albums
Julie London albums
Albums produced by Snuff Garrett
Liberty Records live albums